Abdulla Sultan Ahmed Muftah Al Nasseri (born 9 April 1986), also known as Abdulla Sultan, is an Emirati professional footballer who plays for Al Dhafra as goalkeeper. as of 2010 season he wore no.30 shirt.

References

External links
  Abdullah  Statistics At Goalzz.com
http://www.alainfc.net/en/index.php?p=playerinfo&pid=331

1986 births
Living people
Emirati footballers
Al Ain FC players
Al Dhafra FC players
Ajman Club players
Dibba FC players
UAE Pro League players
Association football goalkeepers